Carnelli  may refer to:

 Carnelli, parlor game 
 Carnelli (surname), a surname

See also 

 Carnielli